The L Word: Generation Q is an American drama television series produced by Showtime that premiered on December 8, 2019. It is a sequel series to The L Word, which aired on Showtime from 2004 to 2009. Similar to its predecessor, the series follows the lives of an LGBTQ group of friends who live in Los Angeles, California.

A first-look screening of the series took place on December 9, 2019, hosted by House of Pride, to coincide with the US release. In January 2020, Showtime renewed the series for a second season which premiered on August 8, 2021. In February 2022, the series was renewed for a third season which premiered on November 20, 2022.

Synopsis
The show centers on a group of diverse LGBTQ+ characters experiencing love, heartbreak, sex, setbacks, personal growth and success in Los Angeles. Generation Q is set over ten years after The L Word, in the new setting of Silver Lake, Los Angeles. Several actors from the original series returned to reprise their roles alongside a new ensemble of diverse characters.

Cast and characters

Main

 Jennifer Beals as Bette Porter-Kennard, the managing director at Isaac Zakarian's art gallery. In between the events of The L Word and Generation Q, she married and divorced her partner, Tina Kennard. She sabotaged Tina's engagement to Carrie Walsh in season 2 and remarried her in season 3 after Tina forgave her. Beals reprises her role from The L Word.
 Kate Moennig as Shane McCutcheon, an androgynous and highly sexual lesbian former hairdresser, now the owner of "Dana's", a gay bar named after her deceased friend, Dana Fairbanks. Moennig reprises her role from The L Word.
 Leisha Hailey as Alice Pieszecki, a talk show host and author. Hailey reprises her role from The L Word.
Arienne Mandi as Dani Nùñez, Bette's former PR manager, Sophie's ex-fiancée and CEO of "Núñez Incorporated" following her father's arrest. She is Iranian on her deceased mother's side.
 Sepideh Moafi as Gigi Ghorbani, the ex-wife of Nat Bailey and co-mother of their children, and currently Dani's girlfriend. Her real name is Golnar, and "Gigi" is a nickname.
 Leo Sheng as Micah Lee, an adjunct professor and therapist working for Nat Bailey who is a trans man, and Maribel Suarez's boyfriend
 Jacqueline Toboni as Sarah Finley, an executive assistant from a religious family. She goes by "Finley", previously worked for Alice Pieszecki and had an affair with Sophie which led to the end of Sophie and Dani's relationship. 
 Rosanny Zayas as Sophie Suarez, a TV producer for Alice's show and Dani's ex-fiancée, having had an affair with Finley not long before their wedding. She and Finley later enter a relationship, which becomes strained due to Finley's alcoholism.
 Jordan Hull as Angelica "Angie" Porter-Kennard (season 2–present; recurring season 1), Bette's daughter with her ex-wife, Tina Kennard, and half-sister of Kayla Allenwood
 Jamie Clayton as Tess Van De Berg (season 3; recurring seasons 1–2), the bartender/manager of Dana's, a recovering alcoholic and girlfriend of Shane

Recurring

 Freddy Miyares as José (seasons 1–2), the new property manager of Dani, Sophie and Micah's home, Micah's ex-boyfriend and husband of Scott
 Carlos Leal as Rodolfo Nùñez, Dani's father
 Brian Michael Smith as Pierce Williams (season 1), Bette's campaign manager who is a trans man
 Stephanie Allynne as Natalie "Nat" Bailey, Gigi's ex-wife and Alice's partner until she realizes she is polyamorous, which leads Alice to end their relationship
 Jillian Mercado as Maribel Suarez, Sophie's sister and an immigration attorney, and Micah's girlfriend
 Olivia Thirlby as Rebecca (season 1), a bisexual Congregationalist minister (MCC) who briefly dates Finley
 Latarsha Rose as Felicity Adams, an ex-employee and ex-lover of Bette's
 Sophie Giannamore as Jordi Sanbolino, Angelica's girlfriend
 Lex Scott Davis as Quiara Thompson, a popular singer and Shane's manipulative ex-wife
 Donald Faison as Tom Maultsby (season 2), an editor who becomes interested in Alice's book and later begins a relationship with her
 Rosie O'Donnell as Carrie (seasons 2–present), the girlfriend of Misty. She was previously engaged to Tina Kennard, but called the engagement off after being repeatedly mistreated by Tina's ex-wife Bette Porter and Tina failed to stand up for her.
 Simon Longnight as Hendrix (season 3), a creative writing instructor at Angie's college and her new love interest after Jordi breaks up with her
 Carmen LoBue as Dre (season 3), Dani's love interest who had a history with Sophie

Special guests
 Laurel Holloman as Tina Kennard, Angelica's biological mother and Bette's wife. The two divorced between shows and Tina became engaged to Carrie Walsh, an engagement which Bette sabotaged out of jealousy in season 2. Tina forgave Bette and remarried her in season 3. Holloman reprises her role from The L Word.
 Roxane Gay as herself
 Megan Rapinoe as herself
 Margaret Cho as herself (season 3)
 Fletcher as herself (season 3)

Guest starring
 Fortune Feimster as Heather
 Jeffrey Muller as Tyler Adams, the ex-husband of Felicity Adams who harbors a grudge against Bette Porter ever since Felicity slept with her
 Mercedes Mason as Lena, Tess' ex-girlfriend
 Rex Linn as Jeff Milner, the Mayor of Los Angeles who won against Bette through fraudulent campaigning
 Griffin Dunne as Isaac Zakarian (season 2), the owner of an art gallery who hires Bette despite her dislike for his views
 Brook'Lynn Sanders as Kayla Allenwood (season 2), Angie's half-sister from Marcus Allenwood
 Vanessa Estelle Williams as Pippa Pascal (seasons 2-3), a talented artist whose career Bette seeks to revive. She later began a relationship with Bette until Bette cheated on her with Tina and remarried Tina. In the season 3 finale, a relationship between Pippa and Sophie is hinted at.
 Anne Archer as Lenore Pieszecki (season 2), Alice's mother. Archer reprises her role from The L Word.
 Rosanna Arquette as Cherie Jaffe (season 2), Shane's ex-lover and Tess's brief new girlfriend but who still pursues Shane. Arquette reprises her role from The L Word.
 Mark Berry as Marcus Allenwood (season 2), an artist and the sperm donor of Angelica Porter-Kennard. Berry replaces Mark Gibson, who portrayed Marcus in The L Word.
 Joanna Cassidy as Patty (season 3), Tess' mother who is suffering from multiple sclerosis and dementia
 Kehlani as Ivy (season 3), a makeup artist who is part Alice's glam squad
 Joey Lauren Adams as Taylor (season 3), a barista who becomes Alice's love interest
 Daniel Sea as Max Sweeney (season 3), Jenny's ex-partner, now a trans parent of four. Sea reprises their role from The L Word.
 Erin Daniels as Dana Fairbanks (season 3), Alice's ex-girlfriend who died of breast cancer and who appears as a figment of Alice's imagination. Daniels reprises her role from The L Word.

Episodes

Series overview

Season 1 (2019–20)

Season 2 (2021)

Season 3 (2022–23)

Production

Development
A sequel to The L Word was confirmed to be in development by Showtime on July 11, 2017. Marja-Lewis Ryan was confirmed as showrunner and executive producer on November 20, 2017; original L Word series creator and showrunner Ilene Chaiken will serve as executive producer, with Jennifer Beals, Katherine Moennig, and Leisha Hailey also serving as executive producers. The L Word:Generation Q will consist of eight episodes.

In anticipation of the show, several LGBTQIA outlets have created special programming, such as Autostraddle's podcast To L & Back: An L Word Podcast; two episodes of RuPaul's podcast, RuPaul: What's the Tee? (one of which is a conversation with L Word producer and cast member Kate Moennig); an episode of Margaret Cho's podcast, The Margaret Cho, featuring comedian Fortune Feimster who will appear in The L Word as a guest star; and Cameron Esposito's podcast, Queery, in which she interviews original L Word creator Ilene Chaiken
.

On January 13, 2020, the series was renewed for a second season. Due to the COVID-19 pandemic, filming for the second season was delayed for several months and was originally expected to premiere in late 2020. Production for the second season finally began in December 2020. On February 4, 2022, Showtime renewed the series for a 10-episode third season which is expected to premiere later this year. Production for the third season began on June 9, 2022.

Casting
Jennifer Beals, Katherine Moennig, and Leisha Hailey reprised their roles from the original series. Bette and Tina's daughter Angelica, depicted as an infant in the original series, was portrayed as a teenager by Jordan Hull. Sarah Shahi stated that she would reprise her role as Carmen de la Pica Morales, though Showtime did not officially confirm her involvement, and Shahi ultimately did not appear in the series. Pam Grier stated that she would not reprise her role as Kit Porter due to shooting conflicts with the ABC series Bless This Mess. Kit was subsequently written out of the series as having died of a drug overdose.

Ryan stated that she wished to introduce new characters to the series in order to have it "live on in a different space." Arienne Mandi, Leo Sheng, Jacqueline Toboni, and Rosanny Zayas were confirmed as series regulars on June 24, 2019, and Sepideh Moafi was confirmed as a series regular on August 2, 2019. Brian Michael Smith and Stephanie Allynne were confirmed for recurring guests on June 27, 2019. Olivia Thirlby, Fortune Feimster, Lex Scott Davis, and Sophie Giannamore were confirmed for guest roles on July 23, 2019, while Freddy Miyares, Jamie Clayton, and Carlos Leal were confirmed for recurring roles on July 31, 2019. On December 2, 2019, Jillian Mercado was cast in a recurring role. Laurel Holloman returning as Tina Kennard was teased during the series' promotion but not confirmed until the sixth episode aired; her appearance was revealed before the episode's opening credits.

On December 9, 2020, for the second season, Jordan Hull was promoted to a series regular while Rosie O'Donnell, Donald Faison, and Griffin Dunne were cast to guest star as Carrie, Tom Maultsby and Isaac Zakarian, respectively. Anne Archer and Rosanna Arquette also returned from the original series to reprise their roles as Lenore Pieszecki and Cherie Jaffe, respectively. On July 27, 2022, Kehlani announced that they are set to guest star for the third season. On August 8, 2022, Margaret Cho, Joey Lauren Adams, and Joanna Cassidy were cast to guest star while Clayton was promoted to a series regular for the third season. On September 21, 2022, Fletcher announced that she is set to guest star for the third season.

Broadcast 
The L Word: Generation Q premiered on December 8, 2019, on Showtime. The UK  television premiere was on Sky Atlantic on February 4, 2020 The first episode of the second season debuted on August 6, 2021, on streaming and on-demand for Showtime subscribers, ahead of its Showtime premiere on August 8, 2021. Each episode of the second season was released to stream on demand every Friday, ahead of its weekly Showtime on-air premiere.
The third season premiered on November 20, 2022, with a new episode available to stream on demand every Friday for Showtime subscribers, ahead of its weekly Showtime on-air premiere.

Reception

Critical response
On review aggregator Rotten Tomatoes, the series holds an approval rating of 81% based on 31 reviews, with an average rating of 6.9/10. The website's critical consensus reads, "Though at times Generation Q doesn't quite stand on its own, it has style and charm to spare and announces a new phrase for The L Word that will please new and old fans alike. On Metacritic, it has a weighted average score of 60 out of 100, based on 13 critics, indicating "mixed or average reviews".

The second season, however, was met with a more polarized response, particularly for its narrative, heavy reliance on throwbacks to the original series, and its negative stereotypes regarding bisexual relationships, butch women and transgender people. The Los Angeles Times put particular emphasis on Carrie, the series' first clear butch character who was portrayed as an overweight, self-loathing, insecure woman easily intimidated by Bette and all femmes in general, and Finley, who was depicted as overly carefree to the point of being drunk and potentially dangerous. Bree Tomas voiced her defense for the butch community, particularly Rosie O'Donnell, who after being cast as Carrie was subjected to online abuse, fat shaming and negative comparisons to Jennifer Beals on social media by fans of the series, which was widely condemned by critics. According to Showbiz Cheat Sheet, following the airing of the second season finale, which saw the end of both Bette and Pippa's relationship and Tina and Carrie's engagement due to Bette's actions and behavior, and ended with a cliffhanger that teased a third reunion between Bette and Tina, fans expressed their displeasure with Bette and Tina's storyline, labelling it as too repetitive and "out of line", and took to Twitter with the hashtag "IleneSavetheLWord". Ilene Chaiken, the creator and showrunner of the original series who herself had come under heavy criticism for reinforcing negative lesbian stereotypes, responded by praising Ryan's work and defending her decision to give Ryan full creative control.

Following the airing of the second episode of season 3, Ryan gave an interview regarding Bette and Tina's relationship. Though she had previously stated during the first season that she wanted to take storylines in different directions, Ryan recanted her statement in the interview and said that her intention had always been to build up towards a wedding between Bette and Tina, revealing that following the first season and the revelation of Tina's engagement to Carrie and Bette's dinner date with Maya, she was harassed with direct messages on social media demanding that she reunite Bette and Tina. The interview was met with both praise and backlash from fans, with some accusing Ryan of choosing predictable and unrealistic fan service over creativity. The return of past characters such as Max Sweeney and Dana Fairbanks, however, was met with praise.

Ratings

Season 1

Season 2

Season 3

Accolades
The L Word: Generation Q was nominated for the Outstanding Drama Series category for the 33rd GLAAD Media Awards in 2022.

Notes

References

External links
 
 

2010s American black television series
2010s American LGBT-related drama television series
2010s American romance television series
2010s romantic drama television series
2019 American television series debuts
2020s American black television series
2020s American LGBT-related drama television series
2020s American romance television series
2020s romantic drama television series
American romantic drama television series
American sequel television series
Bisexuality-related television series
English-language television shows
Hispanic and Latino American television
 
Lesbian-related television shows
LGBT culture in Los Angeles
Serial drama television series
Showtime (TV network) original programming
Television shows directed by Steph Green
Television shows set in Los Angeles
Transgender-related television shows
Polyamory in fiction